Antoine Guillamon (born 4 June 1991) is a French rugby union player. His position is Prop and he currently plays for Montpellier in the Top 14. He began his career with Lyon OU before moving to Stade Toulousain in 2012.

References

External links
"Itsrugby" profile
 Antoine Guillamon on "montpellier-rugby.com"

1991 births
Living people
People from Marsonnas
French rugby union players
Stade Toulousain players
Lyon OU players
Rugby union props
Sportspeople from Ain